Aleksandr Rayevskiy may refer to:
 Aleksander Rayevsky (test pilot) (1957–2008), Russian test pilot
 Alyaksandr Rayewski (born 1988), Belarusian footballer
 Aleksander Rayevsky (born 1984), Russian Japanologist, specialist in Japanese language and modern culture